Choan-Seng Song (born October 19, 1929) is a Distinguished Professor Emeritus of Theology and Asian Cultures at the Pacific School of Religion. He is perhaps the most widely published Asian theologian alive today, writing Christian theology steeped in Asian religious motifs.

Biography 
Song was born into a Presbyterian family in Tainan, and received his early education while Taiwan was under Japanese rule. He studied at National Taiwan University (1950-1954), the University of Edinburgh (1955-1958) and Union Theological Seminary, where he received his PhD in 1965.  Song's dissertation was "The Relation of Divine Revelation and Man's Religion in the Theologies of Karl Barth and Paul Tillich." Song was principal of Tainan Theological College (1965-70) and, later, president of the World Alliance of Reformed Churches (1997-2004).

Theology 
A major theme underlying Song's theology is his attack on the Western-centric nature of Christian theology.  He sees it as highlighting an individualistic gospel that uproots non-Western converts from their original cultures.  It Instead, Song argues, God redemptively works in creation through all cultures, even the so-called "non-Christian" cultures.  Asian Christians are therefore obliged to articulate an Asian theology, coming from the "womb" of Asia.

Song borrows his methodology from Latin American liberation theology, which adopts largely from a Marxist critique on religion and capitalism.  Song describes the people of Asia as being victimized by a history of Western imperialism, both colonially and culturally, creating an identity crisis for Asian Christians.  Hence the task of contextualization is found through liberation of these unjust circumstances and the reconstruction of  a new identity for Asian Christians.

Works
 "New China and Salvation History: A Methodological Inquiry," in South-East Asia Journal of Theology, 15.2 (1974):52-67.
 Christian Mission in Reconstruction: an Asian Analysis, (New York: Orbis Books, 1975). 
 Third-Eye Theology: Theology in Formation in Asian Settings, (New York: Orbis Books, 1979). 
 The Compassionate God: An Exercise in the Theology of Transposition, (New York: Orbis Books, 1982). 
 Theology from the Womb of Asia, (New York: Orbis Books, 1986). 
 Jesus the Crucified People, (Minneapolis: Fortress Press, 1990). 
 Jesus and the Reign of God, (Minneapolis: Fortress Press, 1993). 
 Jesus in the Power of the Spirit, (Minneapolis: Fortress Press, 1994).

References

Further reading
  Contains a comprehensive bibliography of Song's publications up to 1994.

1929 births
Living people
American people of Taiwanese descent
American theologians
National Taiwan University alumni
Alumni of the University of Edinburgh School of Divinity
Taiwanese theologians
American Christian theologians
Union Theological Seminary (New York City) alumni
World Christianity scholars